John Merrill (died 1734), of Lainston, Hampshire, was a British government official and politician who sat in the House of Commons between 1721 and 1734.
 
Merrill was probably the clerk in the pay office who became deputy to John Grubham Howe, the Paymaster-General, by 1710. He was chief clerk to William Pulteney when he was secretary at war from 1715 to 1717. Pulteney said of Merrill ‘He understood the ... revenues ... as well, perhaps better than any man in it … he was the truest friend’.
 
Pulteney was probably instrumental in Merrill's unopposed return as Member of Parliament for Tregony at a by-election on 7 November 1721 in succession to Daniel Pulteney. Merrill was returned unopposed again at the  1722 general election. He was deputy to Pulteney who was Cofferer of the Household from 1723 to 1725 and became a director of the South Sea Company in 1724. By 1725 Pulteney had gone into opposition.  Merrill was not put forward for Tregony at the 1727 general election. He did not re-enter Parliament until a by-election on 23 January 1733, when he was returned as MP  for St Albans by the Duchess of Marlborough on Pulteney's recommendation.  He did not stand in 1734.

Merrill married Susanna Chudleigh, daughter of Hugh Chudleigh of Westminster  He died of gout  on 19 December 1734, leaving one son.

References

1734 deaths
Members of the Parliament of Great Britain for English constituencies
British MPs 1715–1722
British MPs 1722–1727
British MPs 1727–1734